Jaws of Satan, also called by its working title King Cobra, is a 1982 American horror film directed by Bob Claver, and starring Fritz Weaver, Gretchen Corbett, Jon Korkes, and Christina Applegate, in her feature film debut. Its plot follows a preacher from a cursed family who is forced to battle Satan, who has taken the form of a huge King cobra and is also influencing other regular snakes in the area.

Plot
While being transported via train to a carnival, a large king cobra escapes from its cage and kills two railroad workers. The Cobra flees into the night, eventually reaching toward a small Alabama town. One night, the town's Roman Catholic priest, the Rev. Tom Farrow (Weaver) is enjoying dinner and a fire. However, the fire goes out and Rev. Farrow feels the arrival of an uneasy presence. Later in the night, Farrow attends a party and is met by the town's librarian and seer, Evelyn Downs (Douglas), who reveals she foresaw Farrow will face an ancient enemy who has come to claim his soul. While Downs drives home, Farrow contemplates what she said, unaware he is being watched by the Cobra.

The next day, two tree loggers are chopping branches when they are confronted and attacked by a rattlesnake while being watched by the Cobra. While a reporter questions the town's sheriff, in the hospital, Dr. Maggie Sheridan pays a visit to the morgue where the coroner Owens shows the body of the logger and what killed him: two puncture wounds to his face. Realizing there could be a dangerous snake out in the woods, Maggie calls in an expert: herpetologist Dr. Paul Hendricks (Korkes).

When Hendricks arrives, he asks about the snake bite. Maggie takes him to the morgue, only to find the body is gone, as Dr. Owens (Mark Daly Richards) released the body to a funeral home. At his home, Farrow gets a call from Downs, who warns him that the enemy has arrived into town. She says she will come to him and explain more. While Dr. Hendricks is about to leave, Maggie catches up to his cab and shows him the next victim, Evelyn Downs. Hendricks decides to stay and find out what species of snake is causing these attacks.

Back in town, the Sheriff is called to a market store and finds a snake in there. Later at night, Dr. Hendricks drops Maggie off at her home. While freshening up, another rattlesnake enters her home and the Cobra watches from outside. Maggie later finds the rattlesnake on her bed. Petrified, she calls Paul and he races to help her. When he arrives, he kills the rattlesnake and the Cobra leaves. Paul comforts a scared Maggie and stays the night.

The next morning, Father Farrow hears Evelyn Downs died and arrives at Maggie's house to find out what happened. Revealing she was coming to see him, Maggie and Paul tell Farrow that she was killed by a snake. Believing what she said, Father Farrow takes his leave to see his uncle, the Monsignore, telling him that he believes Satan himself (taking the form of a snake, as a snake was the first form Satan took) has come with ill intentions. Meanwhile, Maggie visits the Mayor to try to convince him that he must postpone the upcoming annual dog race. Ignoring her warnings, Maggie leaves furious.

The Monsignore reveals Farrow's father didn't die in the war but committed suicide as a result of something unspeakable coming after him and driving him insane. The Monsignore also reveals other incidences in Farrow's bloodline: violent deaths and strange disappearances every third generation of Farrow's family. The Monsignore says that after St. Patrick was cursed by druids for burning down their shrines, the druid high priest cursed him and his descendants, all the way down to Farrow and his father. The Monsignore warns Farrow that if Satan has come, signs of unnatural occurrences would come to be that would indicate his arrival. Unsure of what to do about it, the Monsignore reminds Farrow that his faith in God will be his strongest weapon.

In a cottage in a nearby field, two teenagers making out are attacked by another snake and taken to the hospital. When the sheriff asks his deputy Jack to go out to the woods to look for the snake, Jack is attacked by the Cobra. The Sheriff finds him dead. After Evelyn's funeral, the Monsignore comes to Farrow with a book speaking of someone in Farrow's family who faced the Serpent before and was able to defeat it. However, the meeting is interrupted by the Cobra itself. The Cobra chases Farrow and causes him to fall into an empty grave. However, Farrow manages to drive the Cobra off with a cross. While Farrow survives, the Monsignore dies.

At a town meeting, Farrow arrives with Paul and Maggie to explain the situation to the townsfolk. As they both try to explain the snake attacks, the Mayor arrives to calm the people down, even dismissing the attacks. Farrow, Paul, and Maggie follow the Mayor to the back room, where he tells them that while there will be a curfew, the group will have limited time to find the Cobra and that the dog track will open regardless of the circumstances. They are also threatened with arrest if they do not keep things quiet.

While the snakes are being searched for, and they manage to find several, Maggie is confronted by a mugger. However, before he can do anything, they are both attacked by the Cobra. They both manage to escape. Paul finds shed King Cobra skin in a cave, where the Cobra is revealed to be living. Paul draws a picture of what Maggie saw and Farrow reveals that before she died, Evelyn Downs warned him that Satan himself had come in the form of a King Cobra.

The next day, Matt Perry's daughter is attacked by another rattlesnake. Paul goes back to the cave and finds a pit of snakes as well as the Cobra itself, but tumbles down a steep embankment and is knocked out. With the Perry's daughter in the hospital, the Mayor decides to cancel the dog track opening. After calling Father Farrow, Maggie goes to the same cave, where she finds Paul, but is captured and put before the Cobra. Farrow blesses himself and goes to confront the Cobra.

Arriving at the caves, Farrow calls out to the Cobra by shouting its name. Using prayer, Father Farrow confronts the Cobra and offers himself in Maggie's place. Praying to God, Farrow's golden cross glows. He shines it on the Cobra's body and the Cobra itself is engulfed in flames and killed. Having survived, Farrow, Paul, and Maggie leave the cave.

Cast

Production

Filming took place in the fall of 1980 in Alabama, in the cities of Tuscaloosa, Demopolis, Eutaw, and Childersburg. The film was shot under the working title King Cobra.

Release

Home media
Scream Factory released the film on Blu-ray as a double-feature with Empire of the Ants (1977) in 2015.

Critical response

Blu-ray.com states that "Jaws of Satan is at times a risibly awful motion picture". However, the reviewer is amused that it combines themes from Jaws and The Exorcist, and notes that "performances are very good" from the actors.

References

External links
 
 

1982 films
1982 horror films
American supernatural horror films
Films about snakes
Films shot in Alabama
Films about Satanism
1980s English-language films
1980s American films